Kailasa is the eponymous debut album of the Indian Sufi/Fusion band Kailasa, led by Kailash Kher. The album was released in the year 2006 in India.

Songs
Kailasa consists of 9 songs. Track no. 8 is a remix of the song 'Tauba Tauba'. The last track 'Allah Ke Bande' is mentioned as live on the track list but it is actually a version recording of song of the same name from the movie 'Waisa Bhi Hota Hai Part II'. The opening track 'Teri Deewani' is a love song mixing themes of love and devotion.  'Jana Jogi De Naal', is a Sufi/folk song. Its lyrics are taken from separate works of Kabirdas and Bulle Shah. Similarly 'Naiharwa' is a traditional song written by Kabirdas.

Album art
The album art is designed by 'Mangoblossom Design' and depicts Kailash Kher as a sage. The back of the CD and vinyl album artwork show all three members of the band.

Track listing

Personnel
 Kailash Kher – lead vocals
 Paresh Kamath – lead guitar
 Naresh Kamath – bass, backing vocals
 Rinku Rajput – piano on tracks 1 & 6; strings on track 1
 Kurt Peters – drums on track 9
 Debyajyoti (Jonqui) Dutta – percussions on track 9

Additional musicians
 Ashwin Srinivasan – flutes on tracks 4 & 6
 Ferozbhai – harmonium on track 3
 Yusuf Mohammed – tabla & dholak on tracks 5,7 & 8
 Jitendra Thakur – violin & viola on tracks 2,5 & 9
 Rakesh Pandit – alaap & backing vocals on track 3
 Pradeep Pandit – backing vocals on track 3

2006 albums
Kailasa (band) albums